Charles Balthazar Julien Févret de Saint-Mémin (1770–1852) was a French portrait painter and museum director. He left France during the Revolution, and worked as a portrait engraver in the United States in the early 19th century. He created portraits from life of George Washington, Thomas Jefferson, and others. He later served as museum director in Dijon.

Brief history

Born in France in 1770 to Benigne Charles Fevret and Victoire Marie de Motmans, Saint-Memin was educated at École Militaire, Paris, graduating in 1785. In 1788 he served in the French Guards.

During the French Revolution, Saint-Memin and his family travelled to Switzerland, and then in 1793 to New York City. They intended to go to Saint-Domingue, ”to prevent the sequestration of the lands of his creole mother [However] in New York news of the sad fate of that colony made them decide to remain where they were. Faced with earning a living, they first tried raising vegetables, but ... this experiment proved inadequate.” Out of necessity, Saint-Memin taught himself to work portraits.

Saint-Memin lived in the United States from 1793 to 1814. During this period he created numerous portraits, often using the physiognotrace technique, invented in 1786 by Gilles-Louis Chretien. Portrait subjects included Alexander Macomb, John Marshall, Thomas Jefferson, George Washington, Christopher G. Champlin, and others.

After returning to France, he worked as director of the Musée des Beaux-Arts de Dijon from 1817 to 1852. He died in Dijon on 23 June 1852.

References

Selected works

Further reading
 Frank Weitenkampf. Sketch of the life of Charles Balthazar Julien Fevret de Saint-Mémin. NY: Grolier Club, 1899.
 Morgan, John Hill. "The Work of M. Fevret de Saint-Mémin," in the Brooklyn Museum Quarterly, January 1918, Vol. V, No. 1.
 Norfleet, Fillmore. Saint-Mémin in Virginia: Portraits and Biographies. Richmond, VA: Dietz Press, 1942.
 Miles, Ellen G. “Saint-Mémin in the South 1803–1809.” Southern Quarterly 25, no. 1 (1986): 22–39.
 Miles, Ellen G.. “Saint-Mémin’s Portraits of American Indians 1804–1807.” American Art Journal 20, no. 4 (1988): 2–33.
 Miles, Ellen G. Saint-Mémin and the Neoclassical Profile Portrait in the America. Washington: National Portrait Gallery and the Smithsonian Institution Press, 1994.
 Christopher Rolfe. Saint-Memin, Charles Balthazar Julien Fevret de (1770–1852). France and the Americas: Culture, Politics, and History. Santa Barbara, CA: ABC-CLIO, 205.

External links

 New-York Historical Society. Guide to the Saint-Mémin Print Collection, 1794–1808, and works by Saint-Mémin in the Museum Collections.
 Library of Congress. Items relating to St.-Memin

Portrait engravers
French engravers
Artists from Dijon
19th-century engravers
1770s births
1852 deaths
19th-century French artists
18th-century engravers
18th-century French artists
French male artists
19th-century French male artists
French emigrants to the United States
18th-century French male artists